Sarpamitra (also known as Sapamita) was a king of Kosambi in India. He was part of the Mitra dynasty of Kosambi.

He may have ruled somewhere around the 1st century BCE or the 1st century CE.

Name
Many of the rulers of the Mitra dynasty bear the suffix "-mitra" in their names. The first part of his name, Sarpa-, while rare is synonymous with Naga. Naga is a more common part in the names of monarchs in Northern and Southern India.

Coins of Sarpamitra
Most rulers of the Mitra dynasty of Kosambi, except Radhamitra, have the symbol known as the tree-in-railing in their coins. Another common symbol is the Ujjain symbol. Bull is a common animal to appear on the coinage of Kosambi of the era.

References

1st-century BC Indian monarchs